The discography of British singer-songwriter RJ Thompson consists of two studio albums, one live album, one demo album, three extended plays and three singles. His first official release was the 11-track Illogical Life, which was released on the iTunes Store on 10 July 2006. Thompson later called Illogical Life a "collection of demos" rather than his first studio release. In 2007 he started releasing EPs. The first of these was the Acoustic Sessions EP on 9 July 2007. Following three years of extensive touring, Thompson returned with the singles "A Better Life" and "When I Get Old" in 2011, which were also featured on The Cognitive Rules EP later the same year. The EP was mastered by Geoff Pesche at Abbey Road Studios. In 2014 he released the single "The Numbers", which also featured a cover of Jimmy Webb's "Highwayman" as a B-side, and followed it up with the House Upon the Hill EP on 24 November 2014 (mastered by Christian Wright at Abbey Road Studios). Thompson returned with his live album, simply titled Live, on 4 July 2016.

In 2017, Thompson released his first official studio album, Echo Chamber.

In October 2020, Thompson released his second album Lifeline. In March 2021, the album received a physical release.

Albums

Studio albums

Live albums

Demo albums

Extended plays

Singles

References

Pop music discographies
Discographies of British artists